Wingo Charlie Anderson (August 13, 1886 – December 19, 1950) was a Major League Baseball player. A left-handed pitcher, Anderson had a listed weight of 150 pounds.

Although Anderson pitched professionally for several seasons in the minor leagues, appearing for teams such as the Longview Cannibals and the Tyler Elbertas, he spent only one season in the major leagues. As a member of the Cincinnati Reds in 1910, he started two games and appeared in five more as a reliever, compiling a 4.67 ERA in 17⅓ innings pitched. He also collected one hit in five at-bats.

External links

1886 births
1950 deaths
People from Johnson County, Texas
Major League Baseball pitchers
Baseball players from Texas
Cincinnati Reds players
Cleburne Railroaders players
Nashville Vols players
Alexandria Hoo Hoos players